Mariol is a commune in the Allier department in central France.

Population

Administration

List of mayors 
 unknown–March 2001: François Dassaud
 March 2001–March 2014: Nicole Eymard
 March 2014–January 2020: Gérard Marsoni
 January 2020 – present: Romain Dejean

See also
Communes of the Allier department

References
 Site of the town hall (in French)

Communes of Allier
Allier communes articles needing translation from French Wikipedia